Pattani railway station or Pattani (Khok Pho) railway station is a railway station located in Khok Pho Subdistrict, Khok Pho District, Pattani. The station opened in April 1917 as Khok Pho Station, as part of the Southern Line section between U Taphao Junction (Hat Yai)-Khlong Sai. The line extended further south, terminating at Su-ngai Kolok in September 1921, where it linked up with the Malaysian railway.

Pattani station's architecture is built as a mix of Thai architecture with Melayu cultural decorations.

Train services 
 Thaksin Special Express train No. 37 / 38 Bangkok - Sungai Kolok - Bangkok
 Diesel Rail Special Express train No. 41 / 42 Bangkok - Yala - Bangkok
 Rapid train No. 169 / 170 Bangkok - Yala - Bangkok
 Rapid train No. 171 / 172 Bangkok - Sungai Kolok - Bangkok
 Rapid train No. 175 / 176 Hat Yai Junction - Sungai Kolok - Hat Yai Junction
 Local train No. 447 / 448 Surat Thani - Sungai Kolok - Surat Thani
 Local train No. 451 / 452 Nakhon Si Thammarat- Sungai Kolok- Nakhon Si Thammarat
 Local train No. 455 / 456 Nakhon Si Thammarat- Yala -Nakhon Si Thammarat
 Local train No. 463 / 464 Phatthalung-Sungai Kolok-Phatthalung

References 
 
 
 

Pattani province
Railway stations in Thailand
Railway stations opened in 1917